Gerald Hayes (born October 10, 1980) is a former American football linebacker. He was drafted by the Arizona Cardinals in the third round of the 2003 NFL Draft. He played college football at Pittsburgh.

Early years
Hayes played his high school football at Passaic County Technical Institute. He was high school teammates with former NFL players Marcel Shipp and Mike Adams.

College career
Hayes attended the University of Pittsburgh and was an Administration of Justice Major and a letterman in football. In football, he was a three-time All-Big East Conference selection and finished his college football career with 402 total tackles, 1.5 sacks, and two interceptions.

Professional career

Arizona Cardinals
On April 18, 2006, he signed a one-year qualifying offer on playing his 4th season with the Cardinals.

He was released by Arizona on July 28, 2011.

San Diego Chargers
The San Diego Chargers signed Hayes on October 11, 2011. He was released on November 6, 2011.

References

1980 births
Living people
African-American players of American football
American football middle linebackers
Arizona Cardinals players
Players of American football from Paterson, New Jersey
Pittsburgh Panthers football players
San Diego Chargers players
21st-century African-American sportspeople
20th-century African-American people